Boulting is an English language surname. Notable people with surname include:

Crispian Boulting (born 1973), British musician
Ingrid Boulting (born 1947), American model and actress
John Boulting (1913–1985), British filmmaker
Ned Boulting (born 1969), British journalist
Roy Boulting (1913–2001), British filmmaker
Sydney Boulting (1912–1998), British filmmaker

Surnames
English-language surnames